The following players have gone on from Bayern Munich II to play for the Bayern Munich first-team.

Notes

Players 2
 
Bayern Munich II
Association football player non-biographical articles